Romania competed at the 1980 Winter Olympics in Lake Placid, United States.

Bobsleigh

Ice hockey

First round - Blue Division

All times are local (UTC-5).

Luge

(Men's) Doubles

Women

Speed skating

Men

References
Official Olympic Reports 
 Olympic Winter Games 1980, full results by sports-reference.com

Nations at the 1980 Winter Olympics
1980
1980 in Romanian sport